Five from the Jazz Band is a 1932 German musical comedy film directed by Erich Engel and starring Jenny Jugo, Rolf von Goth, and Fritz Klippel. It is based on a 1927 play of the same name by Felix Jackson, and was produced by the German subsidiary of Universal Pictures. It was shot at the Johannisthal Studios in Berlin. The film's sets were designed by art director Erich Czerwonski.

Plot 
The wealthy American uncle of vacuum cleaner salesman Peter Pett stipulated in his will that Peter may only inherit the five million dollars left to him if he is happily married. Otherwise, the five million should go to Peter's Scottish cousin Patrick.

Commissioned by the executor, Mister Blubberbloom comes to Europe to see if Peter is happy with his wife Hix too. But the insidious Blubberboom brings Peter to New York without his wife and wants to have the beautiful Mabel appears as his wife at the performance there.

But Patrick, who looks confusingly like his cousin, also wants the money. He appears at Hix and travels with her to New York as well. In the Atlantic Hotel, everyone meets without meeting at first. There are confusing scenes, and even as a viewer it is difficult to tell which of the two Petts you are looking at. Eventually, Blubberbloom reveals himself to be a gangster and hides Hix to avoid meeting her husband. But in the end, Hix and Peter finally meet, hug, and this obvious happiness also decides about the millions. But Patrick doesn't go away empty-handed either: he won Mabel's heart.

Cast

References

Bibliography

External links 
 

1932 films
Films of the Weimar Republic
German musical comedy films
German black-and-white films
1932 musical comedy films
1930s German-language films
Films directed by Erich Engel
Films produced by Joe Pasternak
Films about musical groups
1930s German films
Films shot at Johannisthal Studios